Levashovo is a municipal settlement under the administrative jurisdiction of Vyborgsky District of the federal city of St. Petersburg, Russia, and a station of the Riihimäki – Saint Petersburg Railway. Population:  

The building of the station was designed by Bruno Granholm.

References

Municipal settlements under jurisdiction of Saint Petersburg
Vyborgskiy District of Saint Petersburg